Greenville Lions were an American soccer team that played in the United Soccer Leagues (USL) D3 Pro League (later known as the USL Second Division) and operated an amateur team, Greenville Lions Premier, in the Premier Development League (PDL), the third and fourth tiers of the American soccer pyramid at the time. The team was founded in 2001 and operated until 2003.

The Lions played their home games at Sirrine Stadium on the grounds of Greenville High School in the city of Greenville, South Carolina.

History
The Greenville Lions were founded as a professional soccer team in 2001 based out of Greenville, South Carolina to play in the third tier of the American soccer pyramid at the time, the USL D3 Pro League. The team was owned by Miguel Banda and Scott Halkett served as Club President. Following a successful first season, losing the championship game 0–1 to the Utah Blitzz, the club would launch and operate amateur teams in the USL Premier Development League (PDL) and the Super Y-League

Year-by-year

Competition history

Coaches
  Garth Pollonais 2002–03

Stadia
 Sirrine Stadium, Greenville, South Carolina 2003

References

Soccer clubs in South Carolina
USL Second Division teams
Defunct Premier Development League teams
2001 establishments in North Carolina
2003 disestablishments in North Carolina